Ebertarctia is a genus of tiger moths in the family Erebidae. The moths occur in Iran and Afghanistan.

Species
 Ebertarctia afghanicola (Ebert, 1974)
 Ebertarctia nordstroemi (Brandt, 1947)
 Ebertarctia solitaria (Ebert, 1974)

References
 , 1947: A new Ocnogyna species from N.E.Iran (Lepidoptera: Arctiidae). Entomologisk Tidskrift 68: 90, 1 Foto, Stockholm.
 , 2004: Some generic changes in Arctiinae from South Eurasia with description of three new genera (Lepidoptera, Arctiidae). Atalanta 35 (1/2): 73-83, colour plate IVa.
 , 1974: Zur Taxonomie und Verbreitung der Ocnogyna nordsroemi-Artengruppe (Lep./Arct.). Beiträge zur naturkundlichen Forschung in Südwestdeutschland 33: 169-176, Karlsruhe.
Natural History Museum Lepidoptera generic names catalog

Arctiina
Moth genera